Pechengskoye Rural Community was an administrative division (a rural community) of Kemsky Uyezd of Arkhangelsk Governorate of the Russian Empire, which existed in 1861–1866.

The rural community had the same rights as the volosts in other uyezds.

As of the time of its creation, it included the pogosts of Motovsky, Pazretsky, and Pechengsky.

In 1866, the rural community was transformed into Pechengskaya Volost.

References

Notes

Sources

Former administrative units of Russia
States and territories established in 1861
1866 disestablishments
1861 establishments in the Russian Empire